is a 1958 black-and-white Japanese film directed by Eisuke Takizawa. It is based on a novel of the same name by Kenji Oe. The film was remade three times.

Cast
 Ruriko Asaoka
 Akira Kobayashi

See also
 Zesshō (disambiguation) (絶唱)

References

Japanese black-and-white films
1958 films
Films directed by Eisuke Takizawa
Nikkatsu films
1950s Japanese films

ja:絶唱#1958年版